Michel Bourgeois (2 April 1940 – 16 November 2022) was a French politician of the Socialist Party. He represented Doubs's 2nd constituency in the National Assembly from 2001 to 2002.

Bourgeois died on 16 November 2022, at the age of 82.

References

1940 births
2022 deaths
Socialist Party (France) politicians
Deputies of the 11th National Assembly of the French Fifth Republic
People from Besançon